Sergeiy Liminovich is a Soviet sprint canoer who competed in the late 1970s and early 1980s. He won two medals in the C-1 10000 m at the ICF Canoe Sprint World Championships with a silver in 1979 and a bronze in 1981.

References

Living people
Soviet male canoeists
Year of birth missing (living people)
Russian male canoeists
ICF Canoe Sprint World Championships medalists in Canadian